Christianity is a minority in Hebei province of China. The Shouters are present in the province. China has persecution of Christians. A significant minority of the Catholics of China is in Hebei.
Bishop Yao Liang was from Hebei.
Guo Jincai has been made a bishop of Chengde in Hebei without consent of the pope. Roman Catholic bishop Jia Zhiguo was arrested in 2008. Catholic bishops Su Zhimin and Shi Enxiang from Hebei have been sent to prison by 2010.
Beifang Jinde is a charitable Catholic institution in Shijiazhuang.

Roman Catholic dioceses with seat in Hebei 

Roman Catholic Diocese of Anguo
Roman Catholic Diocese of Baoding
Roman Catholic Diocese of Chengde
Roman Catholic Diocese of Daming
Roman Catholic Diocese of Jingxian
Roman Catholic Diocese of Xianxian
Roman Catholic Diocese of Xuanhua
Roman Catholic Diocese of Yongnian
Roman Catholic Diocese of Zhaoxian
Roman Catholic Diocese of Zhengding

References

See also 
Mentuhui
Spirit Church
Christianity in Hebei's neighbouring provinces
Christianity in Henan
Christianity in Inner Mongolia
Christianity in Liaoning
Christianity in Shandong